Tom McDonald (born September 17, 1946) is an American politician. He was a member of the Missouri House of Representatives, having served from 2009 to 2016. He is a member of the Democratic party.

References

Living people
Democratic Party members of the Missouri House of Representatives
1946 births
21st-century American politicians